Bill Miller (born c. 1967) was a three-time first-team All-American NCAA lacrosse player at Hobart College from 1988 to 1991.

Lacrosse career
Miller teamed with players such as Jeff Tambroni and Tom Gravante to lead Hobart College to the NCAA Men's Lacrosse Championship for four consecutive years, from 1988 through 1991. In the 1991 championship game, the last of an unprecedented 12 straight titles for Hobart, Miller had two goals in defeating previously unbeaten Salisbury, 12-11.

Miller is ninth in all-time NCAA Division III total points, with 173 goals and 145 assists for 318 total points in 67 games. He was awarded the Jack Turnbull Award as Division III National Player of the Year in 1990 and 1991.

Following his years at Hobart, Bill went on to play club lacrosse with Mount Washington, as well as playing on two Team USA World Championship squads in 1994 and 1998. He also won the 1994, 1995 and 1998 NLL Champions Cup Champion with the Philadelphia Wings and was named the game two MVP in the 1998 Champions Cup against the Baltimore Thunder.

Miller played his high school lacrosse at Episcopal Academy. In his senior year, 1987, he led Episcopal to a state championship, winning the Avery F. Blake Memorial Trophy as the de facto Pennsylvania state champion.

Miller coached for two years as an assistant under G.W. Mix at the University of Pennsylvania in 1992 and 1993.

Miller was inducted into the Pennsylvania Lacrosse Hall of Fame in 2002. He was inducted into the National Lacrosse Hall of Fame in 2013.

Miller coaches for the Bronxville (NY) Youth Lacrosse Association, coaching the fifth grade boys program.

Statistics

Hobart College

[a] 18th in NCAA Division III career assists
[b] 9th in NCAA Division III career points
__

Major Indoor Lacrosse League Career

(a)  Philadelphia Wings stats only (may not include complete MILL/NLL stats)

See also
1994 Philadelphia Wings season
Hobart College Athletics
Lacrosse in Pennsylvania
NCAA Men's Lacrosse Championships

External links
Hobart Athletics records site
Hobart Athletics Hall of Fame
Pennsylvania Lacrosse Hall of Fame
Division III Jack Turnbull award winners
Divine Dozen for Hobart, And No One Else Has Any
Avery F. Blake Memorial Trophy - list of Pennsylvania state champion.

Awards

References 

1960s births
Living people
American lacrosse players